Bolan's Zip Gun is the tenth studio album by English rock band T. Rex, released on February 1975 by record label EMI.

Eight of the eleven songs on the album had already been released in the US the previous year on the Light of Love album on Casablanca Records. Zip Gun was a repackage with three extra tracks. However, it was the only T. Rex album that failed to chart in the UK.

Background and production 

Marc Bolan's new partner Gloria Jones and other recent American friends, such as Gloria's brother Richard and backing singer Pat Hall, had helped influence Bolan's music, and he was experimenting with soul inflections.

The album was recorded at MRI Studios in Hollywood, United States. The album was produced by Marc Bolan.

Music and lyrics 

Although the sound of the album was very stark and the lyrics very simple and direct, Bolan had tried to go beyond the rock format of the previous T. Rex sound and reflect his recent immersion in the US soul scene.

Several of the songs had a very futuristic tone, especially "Space Boss", "Think Zinc", and "Golden Belt", Bolan being a great fan of science fiction. The band on this album also featured a twin-drum sound on some tracks, notably "Solid Baby", provided by Davy Lutton and Paul Fenton.

Release 

Bolan’s Zip Gun was released on February 1975 on the T. Rex label (distributed by EMI). It did not chart in the United Kingdom.

Two singles were released from the album: "Light of Love", which reached No. 22 in the UK Singles Chart, and "Zip Gun Boogie".

In 1994, Edsel Records's released Bolan’s Zip Gun as part of their extensive T. Rex reissue campaign, but cut down on the number of bonus tracks. A companion release, entitled Precious Star (The Alternate Zip Gun), was released in 1995 which contained alternative versions, studio rough mixes, a live version and demos of the main album and bonus tracks. A combined album digipak was released in 2002.

Reception 

Upon release, Bolan's Zip Gun was poorly received by critics. In a retrospective review, AllMusic praised the diversity of the material, with tracks like "the delightful knockabout "Precious Star," the unrepentant boogie of "Till Dawn" and the pounding title track" which was a return to the "understated romp he had always excelled at", "Token of My Love" was described as "equally incandescent" for being a playful blues. Reviewer Dave Thompson noted that a sparser sound "emphasized the rhythms, heightened the backing vocals, and left rock convention far behind. "Light of Love," "Golden Belt" and the heavyweight ballad "I Really Love You Babe"" all had "an earthy authenticity".

Pitchfork wrote, "A purposeful return to the looser sound of Electric Warrior, Gun fires blanks. For all its directness, the album is mostly perfunctory, working some of the same sounds and ideas, but the results lack movement and liveliness; Bolan's mojo definitely wasn't working. Worse, he really doesn't sound invested in these songs." However, reviewer Stephen M. Deusner noted that the alternate takes on the second disc of the 2014 reissue were "rougher and rawer" and "vastly improve on these songs, bringing out a charmingly stiff boogie piano on "Precious Star" and the popping bass line on "Light of Love". PopMatters shared a similar opinion saying that "Zip Gun contains enough good moments to preclude classification as a disaster, but just barely." However, reviewer Whitney Strub praised a few tracks saying, ""Light of Love" opens things on a glam-funk note, and "Precious Star" offers irresistibly creamy doo-wop."

Track listing

Personnel 

 Marc Bolan – vocals, guitar, DMS (Dartmouth Music Synthesizer) and Moog 
 Mickey Finn – hand percussion
 Dino Dines – keyboards
 Gloria Jones – backing vocals, clavinet
 Steve Currie – bass guitar
 Harry Nilsson – backing vocals
 Davy Lutton – drums
 Paul Fenton – additional drums on "Solid Baby"
 Bill Legend – drums on "Till Dawn"

Charts

References

External links 

 

T. Rex (band) albums
1975 albums
EMI Records albums